The 1888–89 Scottish Cup was the 16th season of Scotland's most prestigious football knockout competition. 3rd Lanark RV beat Glasgow rivals Celtic (making their Cup début) 2–1 in a replayed final. The original match was won 3–0 by 3rd Lanark RV but the SFA ordered a replay due to the playing conditions.

Calendar

Teams
All 166 teams entered the competition in the first round.

First round
Broughty, Broxburn, Glasgow University, Uddingston, Vale of Leven and 1st Renfrew RV received a bye to the second round.

Matches

Replays

Second replay

Notes

Sources:

Second round
Armadale, Cambuslang Hibernian, Dumbarton, Dunblane, Glasgow University, Irvine and Kirkaldy Wanderers received a bye to the third round.

Matches

Replays

Second replay

Sources:

Third round
Dunfermline Athletic, Fair City Athletic, Methlan Park and Oban received a bye to the fourth round.

Matches

Replays

Notes

Sources:

Fourth round

Matches

Replay

Sources:

Fifth round
Campsie, Dumbarton Athletic and East Stirlingshire received a bye to the quarter-finals.

Matches

Replays

Second replay

Third replay

Sources:

Quarter-finals

Matches

Replay

Second replay

Sources:

Semi-finals

Matches

Sources:

Final

Original

Replay

References

Cup
Scottish Cup seasons
Scot